Fuel. Transit. Sleep. is an EP by American punk rock band Crime In Stereo released through Nitro Records in 2006. All three of the songs on this EP were supposed to end up on the following full-length album The Troubled Stateside; however, the third track was cut out and later re-released in 2008 on the b-side compilation album "Selective Wreckage".

Track listing
Slow Math
I'm On The Guestlist Motherfucker
When The Women Come Out To Dance

Members
 Kristian Hallbert (Vocals)
 Alex Dunne (Guitar)
 Mike Musilli (Bass)
 Scotty Giffin (Drums)

2006 EPs
Crime in Stereo albums